Artyom Olegovich Mikheyev (born 28 October 1987) is a Russian former footballer.

Club career
He made his debut in the Russian Premier League for Luch-Energiya on 2 November 2008 in a game against FC Amkar Perm.

External links
  Player page on the official FC Luch-Energia Vladivostok site
 

1987 births
Living people
Russian footballers
FC Luch Vladivostok players
Russian Premier League players
Association football midfielders
FC Smena Komsomolsk-na-Amure players